Dominic Power (born 5 May 1973) is an English actor. Power has portrayed Leon Taylor in the ITV police drama The Bill and Cameron Murray in the ITV soap opera Emmerdale. Eastenders as Peter He is currently appearing in the Channel 4 soap opera Hollyoaks as Dave Chen-Williams.

Television
Power was given his first major television role in 2008, appearing as PC Leon Taylor in the ITV police drama The Bill, having previously appeared in a guest role. He began appearing on screen from June 2008. Leon was one of only three uniform officers to stay with the show until its final episode, which was aired on 31 August 2010.

He was then cast in the ITV soap opera Emmerdale as Cameron Murray. His character in Emmerdale was responsible for the murders of three major characters - Carl King (Tom Lister), Alex Moss (Kurtis Stacey) and Gennie Sharma (Sian Reese-Williams). The character died after being electrocuted within the flood that occurred in the pub's cellar. For his role, in 2013, Power won the Best Bad Boy award at the Inside Soap Awards.

In August 2014, Power appeared in the opening episodes of the second series of the Channel 5 crime drama Suspects, playing murder suspect Saul Hammond, a paranoid schizophrenic. Katy Brent of the Daily Mirror said: "The standout performance is from Dominic Power – last seen as crazy-eyed, gun-toting Cameron Murray in Emmerdale. Dominic gives a stellar performance as Saul's mental state disintegrates, leaving him confused and questioning his own innocence." It was announced in April 2015 that he had joined the cast of the ITV drama Unforgotten. In December 2021, he joined the cast of the Channel 4 soap opera Hollyoaks as Dave Chen-Williams.

Filmography

Awards and nominations

References

External links
 

1973 births
Alumni of the Anna Scher Theatre School
English male soap opera actors
English male television actors
Living people